Xeniidae is a family of soft coral in the order Alcyonacea.

Predators 
Predatory sea slugs of the genus Phyllodesmium are reported to feed on Xeniidae species. Representatives of this family have been observed to provide shelter to juvenile fish.

List of genera 
The family contains the following genera:

References

External links

 
Alcyoniina
Cnidarian families
Taxa named by Christian Gottfried Ehrenberg